In a legal context, a chilling effect is the inhibition or discouragement of the legitimate exercise of natural and legal rights by the threat of legal sanction. A chilling effect may be caused by legal actions such as the passing of a law, the decision of a court, or the threat of a lawsuit; any legal action that would cause people to hesitate to exercise a legitimate right (freedom of speech or otherwise) for fear of legal repercussions. When that fear is brought about by the threat of a libel lawsuit, it is called libel chill. A lawsuit initiated specifically for the purpose of creating a chilling effect may be called a Strategic Lawsuit Against Public Participation (SLAPP).

"Chilling" in this context normally implies an undesirable slowing. Outside the legal context in common usage; any coercion or threat of coercion (or other unpleasantries) can have a chilling effect on a group of people regarding a specific behavior, and often can be statistically measured or be plainly observed. For example, the news headline "Flood insurance [price] spikes have chilling effect on some home sales," and the abstract title of a two-part survey of 160 college students involved in dating relationships: "The chilling effect of aggressive potential on the expression of complaints in intimate relationships."

Usage

In United States and Canadian law, the term chilling effects refers to the stifling effect that vague or excessively broad laws may have on legitimate speech activity.

However, the term is also now commonly used outside American legal jargon, such as the chilling effects of high prices or of corrupt police, or of "anticipated aggressive repercussions" (in say, personal relationships).

A chilling effect is an effect that reduces, suppresses, discourages, delays, or otherwise retards reporting concerns of any kind.

An example of the "chilling effect" in Canadian case law can be found in Iorfida v. MacIntyre where the constitutionality of a criminal law prohibiting the publication of literature depicting illicit drug use was challenged. The court found that the law had a "chilling effect" on legitimate forms of expression and could stifle political debate on issues such as the legalization of marijuana. The court noted that it did not adopt the same "chilling effect" analysis used in American law but considered the chilling effect of the law as a part of its own analysis.

Regarding Ömer Faruk Gergerlioğlu's case in Turkey, the Office of the United Nations High Commissioner for Human Rights (OHCHR) said that Turkey's mis-use of counter-terrorism measures can have a chilling effect on the enjoyment of fundamental freedoms and human rights.

History

In 1644 John Milton expressed the chilling effect of censorship in Areopagitica:

The term chilling effect has been in use in the United States since as early as 1950. The United States Supreme Court first refers to the "chilling effect" in the context of the United States Constitution in Wieman v. Updegraff in 1952.

It, however, became further used as a legal term when William J. Brennan, a justice of the United States Supreme Court, used it in a judicial decision (Lamont v. Postmaster General) which overturned a law requiring a postal patron receiving "communist political propaganda" to specifically authorize the delivery.

The Lamont case, however, did not center around a law that explicitly stifles free speech. The "chilling effect" referred to at the time was a "deterrent effect" on freedom of expression—even when there is no law explicitly prohibiting it. However, in general, the term "chilling effect" is also used in reference to laws or actions that may not explicitly prohibit legitimate speech, but rather impose undue burden on speech.

Chilling effects on Wikipedia users 

Edward Snowden disclosed in 2013 that the US government's Upstream program was collecting data on people reading Wikipedia articles. This revelation had significant impact on the self-censorship of the readers, as shown by the fact that there were substantially fewer views for articles related to terrorism and security. The court case Wikimedia Foundation v. NSA has since followed.

See also
 Censorship
 Culture of fear
 Fear mongering
 Media transparency
 Opinion corridor
 Prior restraint
 Self-censorship
 Strategic lawsuit against public participation

References

External links
 Lumen, containing many current examples of alleged chilling effects
 Terms associated with libel cases
 Cato Policy Analysis No. 270 Chilling The Internet? Lessons from FCC Regulation of Radio Broadcasting
 Libel Reform Campaign The Chilling Effect of English libel law

Censorship
Freedom of expression
American legal terminology